Yusuf Ramazan Bay (born 6 February 1995) is a Turkish badminton player.

Achievements

BWF International Challenge/Series 
Men's doubles

  BWF International Challenge tournament
  BWF International Series tournament
  BWF Future Series tournament

References

External links 
 

1995 births
Living people
Turkish male badminton players